Ruan Gregório Teixeira (born 29 May 1995), known simply as Ruan, is a Brazilian professional footballer who plays as a right back for MLS club D.C. United.

Career
On 16 January 2019, Ruan joined Major League Soccer club Orlando City on a one-year loan from Brazilian club Barra da Tijuca. He had previously had loan spells in Brazil with Madureira, Boa, Internacional and Ponte Preta. He made 28 appearances for Orlando across all competitions and was named to the MLS Team of the Week three times in 2019.

On 22 November 2019, Orlando announced the permanent transfer of Ruan ahead of the 2020 season, signing him to a two-year contract with an option for a third. Ruan remained the first choice right-back for Orlando when available, making 52 appearances across the next two seasons including 46 starts. He registered four assists in each of the 2020 and 2021 seasons. Following the team's run to the MLS is Back Tournament final, Ruan was named in the MLS is Back Best XI. Having not scored during 2019 or 2020, Ruan scored his first goal for the club on 15 September 2021 in a 4–2 defeat to CF Montréal, before scoring again in the following game four days later, a 3–1 defeat against Philadelphia Union.

Ahead of the 2022 season, Ruan signed a new two-year deal with the option for a third year.

On 21 December 2022, Ruan was traded to D.C. United in exchange for the #2 overall selection in the 2023 MLS SuperDraft.

Career statistics

Honours

Club
Orlando City
U.S. Open Cup: 2022

References

External links
 
 

1995 births
Living people
Footballers from Rio de Janeiro (city)
Brazilian footballers
Campeonato Brasileiro Série B players
Campeonato Brasileiro Série D players
Madureira Esporte Clube players
Boa Esporte Clube players
Sport Club Internacional players
Associação Atlética Ponte Preta players
Brazilian expatriate footballers
Orlando City SC players
Brazilian expatriate sportspeople in the United States
Association football fullbacks
Major League Soccer players
D.C. United players